Bouverans is a commune in the Doubs department in the Bourgogne-Franche-Comté region in eastern France. Lac de l'Entonnoir is located in the commune.

Population

See also
 Communes of the Doubs department

References

Communes of Doubs